The following table ranks the tallest air traffic control (ATC) towers at airports in the United States.

Air traffic control towers are elevated structures for the visual observation and control of the air and ground traffic at an airport. The placement and height of an ATC tower are determined by addressing the many FAA requirements and site-specific considerations to ensure safety within the National Airspace System (NAS). 
The FAA has stated that new towers should be constructed with a goal of providing the shortest possible tower required to meet siting criteria for that specific airport. These criteria result in a wide variation of tower height with some rivaling or surpassing the tallest office buildings in their respective cities. ATC towers however are generally not recognized by The Council on Tall Buildings and Urban Habitat (CTBUH) as buildings because they do not meet the criteria of having at least 50 percent of their height as occupiable. For this reason, they are not ranked among a city's tallest buildings but fall under the category of "telecommunications/observation tower." Examples of notably tall towers that are not ranked as buildings are the Indianapolis International Airport ATC Tower and the Soldiers' and Sailors' Monument in Indiana.

The air traffic control tower of the Hillsboro Airport can be seen behind a row a small airplanes and buildings in the city of Hillsboro, Oregon.

Tallest ATC Towers in the U.S.

References

External links

 https://www.ctbuh.org/
Air traffic control in the United States